Steven Forrest Hotze (born 1950) is an American conservative talk radio host, conspiracy theorist, physician, Republican activist and megadonor in Texas.

Hotze is known as a supporter of a variety of right-wing political causes: against LGBT anti-discrimination protections, against COVID vaccine mandates, and as a proponent of Donald Trump's false claims that he was cheated in the 2020 presidential election. Hotze is currently under criminal indictment on two charges (unlawful restraint and aggravated assault with a deadly weapon), for his alleged involvement in a private investigation into supposed "voter fraud" that resulted in a private investigator (who was hired by Hotze) attacking and holding an air conditioning repairman at gunpoint.

Career
In 1976, Hotze graduated from the University of Texas Medical Branch with his Doctor of Medicine. He promoted a series of claims with no basis in science, including that taking birth control pills made women "less attractive to men" and that "when men lose their testicles to disease or injury, they have difficulty reading a map, performing math problems and making decisions." In December 2020, Vice described Hotze's medical practice as "hawking 'alternative treatments' for postpartum depression, aging, thyroid problems, and even COVID-19". Hotze has promoted various fringe and pseudoscientific medical claims, such as the existence of "yeast hypersensitivity syndrome"; the use of colloidal silver as a cure for various diseases; and the use of non-standard drugs for hypothyroidism. A seller of hormone therapy products, Hotze gained wealth through a chain of "wellness centers" in Texas. He asserted that his line of bioidentical hormones prevented cancer, a claim that lacks scientific support. Hotze has been a practicing physician since at least 2000, and is based in Katy, Texas.

In a 2005 appearance on the CBS Early Show, Hotze advanced his views about thyroid disorders; in a letter to CBS, the American Association of Clinical Endocrinologists criticized Hotze's statements as "completely erroneous and unsubstantiated, and ... readily refuted by a large body of solid scientific evidence." In 2018, an environmental organization filed suit against Hotze's businesses, alleging that some of its consumer products contained undisclosed quantities of lead; that suit is pending.

Hotze published a book, Hormones, Health and Happiness, through an Austin, Texas vanity press.

Activism
Hotze has been involved in right-wing activism since at least 1982. His far-right views have sometimes caused friction with fellow Republicans. He has claimed that malpractice lawsuits are "un-Biblical"; supported Houston mayoral candidate Louie Welch who promoted fighting HIV/AIDS by "shoot[ing] the queers"; and advocated for greater influence of Christianity upon government. A power broker in Texas Republican circles, he is influential among the Texas religious right, and was described by The Texas Tribune in 2020 as "one of most prolific culture warriors on the right in Texas." He has donated to Republican politicians and candidates, including  to U.S. Senator John Cornyn, and is a major ally of Lieutenant Governor Dan Patrick. Hotze hosted a conservative talk radio show on the radio station KSEV beginning in the early 2000s, when the station was co-managed by Patrick; Hotze remained on the air until 2011.

In 2013, Hotze brought lawsuits against the Affordable Care Act, asserting that the health-care reform law was unconstitutional; he released two anti-ACA pop-techno music tracks entitled "God Fearing Texans Stop Obamacare" and "Texans Stand Against Obamacare" containing lyrics such as "We will defeat Obama and the socialists" and "Texas should be free again, it should be an independent nation."

Hotze's influence within Republican state and local politics in Texas, wielded in the form of endorsements, fundraising, and donations, may have peaked in the 2002–2013 period, when his ally Jared Woodfill was chairman of the Harris County Republican Party at a time when Republicans dominated the county. In 2016, Hotze was a leading supporter of Woodfill's unsuccessful far-right campaign for chairman of the Texas Republican Party.

Hotze has promoted conspiracy theories such as QAnon and has asserted that the COVID-19 pandemic was a "global ritual" to "inject experimental nano bots and chemi-kills into our bodies to alter our DNA using Artificial Intelligence (AI) technology to turn us into zombie-like, controlled masses and weapons of war."

Anti-LGBT activism
Hotze has opposed homosexuality since at least 1986, once comparing "LGBT people to Nazis and pledg[ing] to drive 'homofascists' from Houston to San Francisco." , Hotze led the Conservative Republicans of Texas; the organization, which describes itself as promoting "constitutional liberties based upon Biblical principles", was designated in 2016 by the Southern Poverty Law Center as an anti-LGBT hate group. Hotze also featured prominently in the defeat of 2015's Houston Equal Rights Ordinance (calling the legislation a "Satanic movement"), and failed in his push for Texas' bathroom bill (2017). In 2016, Hotze likened LGBT people to termites, saying they "eat away at the very moral fabric of the foundation of our country."

The Houston-based Hotze is opposed to the legalization of same-sex marriage. After the U.S. Supreme Court's 2015 decision in Obergefell v. Hodges, Hotze spoke at the kick-off for anti-gay marriage organization Real Marriage: One Man/One Woman for Life, saying of same-sex marriage proponents, "They want to intimidate individuals, churches, schools and families to celebrate those that participate in anal sex. That's what they love and enjoy: anal sex. And that's bad, that's evil. It's a terrible thing to try to do and they want to try to teach it to kids in schools, […] Kids will be encouraged to practice sodomy in kindergarten."

Hotze has opposed a section of the Affordable Care Act that mandates insurance providers to cover pre-exposure prophylaxis for the prevention of HIV. His company is the lead plaintiff in Braidwood Management v. Becerra, a suit filed in the Northern District of Texas by a group of conservative Christian employers in opposition to the mandate. In the lawsuit, Hotze claims that he opposes paying for a health insurance plan that covers drugs like Truvada or Descovy "because these drugs facilitate or encourage homosexual behavior, which is contrary to Dr. Hotze’s sincere religious beliefs."

COVID-19 pandemic
In March 2020, Hotze claimed that coronavirus disease 2019 was an invention of the "deep state" designed to sabotage the presidency of Donald Trump. Hotze later filed least eight lawsuits challenging public health measures adopted by the State of Texas, Harris County, and the City of Houston to prevent the spread of the virus. In April, he sued Lina Hidalgo, the county judge of Harris County, Texas, for mandating the wearing of face masks. Hotze's request to block the county order was rejected by the court.

In June, he filed suits against Texas Governor Greg Abbott, alleging that contact tracing violated the US Constitution's First Amendment, privacy, Due Process, and Equal Protection provisions, and that the governor's state-wide face mask requirement was unlawful. Hotze also sued Abbott over his executive orders closing nonessential businesses during the pandemic and sued the city of Houston over its decision to bar the Republican Party of Texas from holding an in-person convention at the George R. Brown Convention Center during the pandemic; both of those suits were dismissed.

2020 elections
In the 2020 elections, Hotze joined Texas Representative Steve Toth, a Harris County Republican, in attempting to have 127,000 Harris County votes rejected for being cast via drive-thru voting (claiming it to be an unlawful expansion of curbside voting). The Supreme Court of Texas rejected the lawsuit, prompting Hotze and Toth to pursue the claim in federal court. That lawsuit was also rejected.

Criminal indictment
In August 2020, Hotze founded the nonprofit Liberty Center for God and Country (LCGC), and claimed to have donated  to the group.

Hotze hired Mark Anthony Aguirre as the group's lead investigator; Aguirre had been fired from the Houston Police Department in 2003 after ordering the mass arrest of 300 people in a botched raid on a Kmart parking lot. Aguirre surveilled an ordinary air-conditioner installer/repairman for days, falsely claiming that the man was part of a vast election fraud scheme and was using his cargo truck to carry "750,000 mail-in ballots fraudulently signed by Hispanic children" (the cargo truck was actually carrying tools and air conditioning equipment). According to police and prosecutors, Aguirre surveilled the repairman for four days, and then—around 5:30 
a.m. on October 17, 2020—used his SUV to run the repairman off the road, pretended to be injured, then pointed a gun at the repairman and ordered the man to get on the ground while directing two of his companions to search the repairman's trunk. The incident was one of several tactics used by far-right organizations in an attempt to support Trump's false claims that the 2020 election was barred by fraud.

Aguirre was paid $266,400 by Hotze's group, with most of that sum ($211,400) being paid the day after the incident with the air conditioning repairman. Aguirre was arrested and charged with aggravated assault with a deadly weapon in December 2020; he pleaded not guilty. He was released on $30,000 bail on several conditions, including that he not work for Hotze. After his arrest, Hotze called Aguirre "a very good investigator"; described the charges as "bogus"; and expressed his pride in the operation. Hotze also blamed the Republican Party for not doing it themselves.

In April 2021, Hotze attended a fundraiser on behalf of Republican state Attorney General Ken Paxton, as well as businessman Mike Lindell, a prominent Trump ally and 2020 election conspiracy theorist.

In April 2022, Hotze himself was charged in connection with the bizarre 2020 incident with the air conditioning repairman; a Harris County grand jury indicted him on one count of unlawful restraint and one count of aggravated assault with a deadly weapon. The air conditioning repairman also fired a civil suit against Hotze and his LCGC group.

In an April 2020 deposition, Hotze said under oath that lacked any knowledge of surveillance or investigation of the air conditioning repairman. This claim was apparently contradicted by a transcript of a phone call made by Hotze to U.S. Attorney for the Southern District of Texas Ryan Patrick, on October 17, 2020, two days before the repairman was attacked. The phone call was recorded by Patrick, a Trump appointee, and the transcript was made public in May 2022, as part of prosecutors' disclosure of evidence they intend to use against Hotze. In the call, Hotze sought to get federal authorities to stop a white van that he claimed to be moving phony ballots as part of an election rigging scheme, and said that one of his investigators was prepared to confront the repairman himself: "In fact, he told me last night, 'hell ... the guy's gonna have a wreck tomorrow night. I'm going to run into him and I'm gonna make a citizen's arrest.'" Patrick rejected Hotze's request; it is unclear what he did with the recording afterward.

George Floyd protests
After nationwide protests following the murder of George Floyd reached Texas in early June 2020, Hotze called Governor Abbott's office on June 6 and demanded Texas Army National Guard soldiers be sent to Houston with "the order to shoot to kill if any of these son-of-a-bitch people start rioting like they have in Dallas, start tearing down businesses — shoot to kill the son of a bitches. That's the only way you restore order. Kill 'em. Thank you." When The Texas Tribune obtained and published Hotze's message on July 3, Hotze himself shared it on Facebook. Senator Cornyn called it "absolutely disgusting and reprehensible".

References

External links

1950 births
20th-century American physicians
21st-century American physicians
American anti-same-sex-marriage activists
Living people
People from Houston
People in alternative medicine
Texas Republicans